1981–1982, also often known by its catalog number "Factus 8", or "1981-Factus 8-1982", is a five-track EP released by New Order in November 1982 by Factory.

Overview
The EP was put together for the American market as a compilation of three of New Order's early singles. It contains "Procession" from September 1981, plus the 12" versions of "Everything's Gone Green" (released December 1981) and "Temptation" (released May 1982) and two of the b-sides, "Mesh" and "Hurt". A second b-side to "Everything's Gone Green", "Cries and Whispers" is omitted, as is New Order's first single "Ceremony" / "In a Lonely Place". The sleeve was designed by Peter Saville and uses a painting from his then-girlfriend Martha Ladly.

The Village Voice critic Robert Christgau described this version of "Temptation" as being "where Manchester's finest stop hearing ghosts and stake their claim to a danceable pop of unprecedented grimness and power," noting that it was "the first real song this sharp-cornered sound-and-groove band has ever come up with."

The EP also documents the band's break from producer Martin Hannett, who had produced Movement and both of Joy Division's studio albums. While Hannett produced "Everything's Gone Green", "Procession" and "Mesh", the other two songs on the EP were produced by New Order. Bernard Sumner remarked: "Martin's last track was "Everything's Gone Green" – fact he walked out halfway through the mix because Hooky and me asked him to turn the drums up".

Reissue of EP tracks

All of the tracks from 1981–1982 were eventually re-released on the bonus CD in the 2008 Collector's Edition of Movement, along with other tracks from the same period.

Track listing
all writing Gillian Gilbert, Peter Hook, Stephen Morris, Bernard Sumner

Side One
"Everything's Gone Green" – 5:30
"Procession" – 4:27
"Mesh" – 3:02

Side Two
"Temptation" – 8:47
"Hurt" – 8:03

A late-1980s Canadian issue of the EP on CD reverses the original side sequence, beginning with "Temptation" and ending with "Mesh".

Personnel
New Order
 Bernard Sumner – Vocals, guitars, melodica, synthesisers & programming
 Peter Hook – 4- and 6-stringed bass
 Gillian Gilbert – Synthesizers and programming, guitars
 Stephen Morris – Drums, synthesisers and programming
Technical
 Martin Hannett – Production ("Everything's Gone Green", "Procession" and "Mesh")
 Chris Nagle – Engineering
 John and Flood – Assistants

Charts

References

New Order (band) EPs
1982 debut EPs
Albums produced by Martin Hannett
Factory Records EPs